Canyonlands Regional Airport, Moab  is a regional commercial airport in Grand County, Utah, United States,  northwest of Moab. The airport services two airlines, one subsidized by the Essential Air Service program.

The Federal Aviation Administration reported 2,870 enplanements (passenger boardings) at the airport in calendar year 2008, 3,982 in 2009, 2,701 in 2010,  9,181 in 2011, 7,955 in 2012, 7,048 in 2013, and 9,843 (unofficial) in 2017. The National Plan of Integrated Airport Systems for 2011–2015 categorized it as a non-primary commercial service airport (between 2,500 and 10,000 enplanements per year).

History
In the latter 2010s, the terminal building was greatly expanded to handle upcoming 50-seat regional jets.

Historical airline service

From 1959 to 1965, the original Frontier Airlines served the previous airfield, Grand County Airport, eight miles southeast of Moab, followed by service to Canyonlands from 1965 to 1975. In 1959, Frontier Douglas DC-3s flew direct to Denver with stops in Grand Junction, Montrose, Gunnison, and Pueblo. From the new airport, Frontier Convair 580s flew direct to Albuquerque, Denver, El Paso, Phoenix, Salt Lake City, and Tucson with stops. By late 1970, Frontier 580s flew to Denver via Grand Junction. Service was paused in 1973 for airport construction at which time Western Air Stages provided flights to Grand Junction using a much smaller Beechcraft Queen Air model 80. Frontier returned in late 1973 but then ended all service by late 1974.

Several commuter airlines then served Moab mainly with flights to Salt Lake City, Denver, or Grand Junction. These carriers are funded through the federal government Essential Air Service Program, and their service comes up for bid every two years. These airlines included:

Sun Valley Key Commuter 1974–1976, Piper Navajos to Salt Lake City and Grand Junction. Frontier Airlines timetables listed Sun Valley Key flights between Moab and Grand Junction to connect with Frontier to Denver until mid-1976.
SkyWest Airlines, summer 1975, Piper Navajos to Page, Arizona and Las Vegas, Nevada.
Transwestern Airlines 1977/1980, Piper Navajos to Salt Lake City and Blanding, Utah.
Alpine Air 1984 through the latter 1990s, Pipers to Salt Lake City. The OAG shows no air service to Moab for several years in the late 1990s.
Sunrise Airlines 2000 thru early 2001 with Jetstream 31's to Salt Lake City.
Great Lakes Airlines dba United Express June 7, 2001, to early 2004, Beech 1900Ds to Denver and Phoenix. The Phoenix flight stopped in Page, Arizona. The representation as United Express ended in early 2002 and Great Lakes continued serving Moab under their own identity.
Salmon Air, May 2004 to June 2006, Piper Navajos to Salt Lake City.
Air Midwest dba America West Express, July 2, 2006, to November 3, 2007, Beechcraft 1900Ds to Salt Lake City and Phoenix. The Phoenix flight stopped in Farmington, New Mexico.
Air Midwest dba US Airways Express, November 4, 2007, to January 5, 2008, same as above.
Great Lakes Airlines returned on January 6, 2008, operating under their own identity with two daily Beechcraft 1900Ds to Denver International Airport. Daily nonstop flights were later added to Vernal, Utah, Ely, Nevada, and Prescott, Arizona, as an extension of its Denver service. Great Lakes ended service to Moab in January 2014.
SkyWest Airlines dba Delta Connection, March 2, 2014, to April 2015, Embraer 120s to Salt Lake City. SkyWest prematurely discontinued service due to the retirement of the Embraer Brasilia prop aircraft and there was then no air service at Moab for the next year.
Boutique Air, March 30, 2016, to February 28, 2018, Pilatus PC-12s to Denver and Salt Lake City.
SkyWest Airlines returned on May 1, 2018 (now as United Express) with Canadair CRJ-200s to Denver after the Moab airport runway was improved to handle regional jets.
Delta Air Lines returned on May 5, 2021, with daily summer seasonal service to Salt Lake City International Airport flown by Delta Connection partner SkyWest using CRJ-200.

Airlines and destinations

Passenger

Delta Connection service is operated by regional airline partner SkyWest using CRJ-200 aircraft.

The United Express service is operated by SkyWest Airlines via a code sharing agreement with United Airlines and is flown with Canadair CRJ-200s.

Facilities

In the year ending December 31, 2018 the airport had 15,750 aircraft operations, average 43 per day: 71% general aviation, 28% air taxi, and 2% military. 46 aircraft were then based at this airport: 40 single-engine, 1 multi-engine, 3 helicopters and 2 ultralight. The airport will be closed for facility upgrades until May 2018, but the helipad will remain open.

With the addition of regional jets in 2018, the terminal building underwent a major expansion.

Accidents and incidents
On August 22, 2008, a Beechcraft King Air, operating for Southwest Skin and Cancer LLC, leased from Leavitt Group Wings, LLC, impacted hilly terrain about 1.2 miles south of CNY shortly after takeoff in visual meteorological conditions bound for Cedar City Regional Airport. All ten occupants (nine passengers, one pilot) were killed.

See also

 List of airports in Utah

References

External links

 
 Aerial image as of July 1997 from USGS The National Map
 

Airports in Utah
Transportation in Grand County, Utah
Buildings and structures in Grand County, Utah
Essential Air Service